Robinsonia flavomarginata is a moth in the family Erebidae. It was described by Herbert Druce in 1899. It is found in Colombia and the Amazon region.

References

Moths described in 1899
Robinsonia (moth)